Ampullariidae, commonly known as the Mystery snails, is a family of large freshwater snails, aquatic gastropod mollusks with a gill and an operculum. These snails simultaneously have a gill and a lung as functional respiratory structures, which are separated by a division of the mantle cavity. This adaptation allows these animals to be amphibious. Species in this family are considered gonochoristic, meaning that each individual organism is either male or female.

Systematics and taxonomy 
Ampullariidae belongs to the superfamily Ampullarioidea, and is also its type family. It comprised two subfamilies according to the taxonomy of the Gastropoda by Bouchet & Rocroi, 2005, which followed the classification proposed by Berthold (1991), including Ampullariinae Gray, 1824, and Afropominae Berthold, 1991. The current classification accepted by WoRMS includes Ampullariinae and Pomaceinae Starobogatov, 1983.

Genera 
Ampullariidae are probably of Gondwanan origin, and the diversification of Ampullariidae started probably after the separation of the African and South American continental plates. The sister group of Ampullariidae has not been clearly identified yet. A cladogram showing phylogenic relations of 6 genera belonging to Ampullariidae was proposed by Jørgensen and colleagues in 2008.

There are nine extant genera in the family Ampullariidae:

 Subfamily Ampullariinae Gray, 1824
 tribe Ampullariini 
 Ampullaria Lamarck, 1799 – type genus of the subfamily Ampullariinae., This genus is not treated as a valid extant genus Ampullariidae and is considered a synonym of Pila Röding, 1798 . nomenclatorical details about Ampullaria
 Forbesopomus Bequaert & Clench, 1937
 Lanistes Montfot, 1810
 Pila Röding, 1798

 tribe Sauleini
 Saulea Gray, 1868 – type genus of the tribe Sauleini

Afropominae
 Afropomus Pilsbry & Bequaert, 1927 – type genus of the subfamily Afropominae, with the only species Afropomus balanoidea (Gould, 1850). It is treated by WoRMS as belonging to the subfamily Ampullariinae.

 Subfamily Pomaceinae Starobogatov, 1983
 Asolene d'Orbigny, 1838
 Felipponea (Dall, 1919)
 Marisa J. E. Gray, 1824
 Pomacea Perry, 1810

Unassigned to a subfamily
 † Carnevalea Harzhauser & Neubauer, 2016
 † Doriaca Willmann, 1981
 † Euphepyrgula G.-X. Zhu, 1980 

 † Mesolanistes Yen, 1945 
 † Pictavia Cossmann, 1925 
 Pomella Gray, 1847: synonym of Pomacea Perry, 1810
 † Pseudoceratodes Wenz, 1928
 † Sudanistes Harzhauser & Neubauer, 2017

Synonyms
 Effusa Jousseaume, 1889: synonym of Pomacea Perry, 1810 (junior synonym)
 PomellaGray, 1847: synonym of Pomacea Perry, 1810
 Ampullaria Lamarck, 1799: synonym of Pila Röding, 1798
 Ampullarius Montfort, 1810: synonym of Pila Röding, 1798 (invalid: unjustified emendation of Ampullaria)
 Ampulloidea d'Orbigny, 1841: synonym of Asolene d'Orbigny, 1838 (unnecessary substitute name for Asolene)
 † Ampullopsis Repelin, 1902 : synonym of Pila Röding, 1798 (junior subjective synonym)
 Ceratodes Guilding, 1828: synonym of Marisa (gastropod) Gray, 1824 (junior objective synonym of Marisa)
 Subfamily Lanistinae Starobogatov, 1983: synonym of Ampullariidae Gray, 1824
 Leroya Grandidier, 1887: synonym of Lanistes Montfort, 1810
 Limnopomus Dall, 1904: synonym of Pomacea Perry, 1810
 Meladomus Swainson, 1840: synonym of Lanistes Montfort, 1810
 Pachychilus Philippi, 1851: synonym of Pila Röding, 1798 (unjustified emendation of Pachylabra)
 Pachylabra Swainson, 1840: synonym of Pila Röding, 1798 (unnecessary nom. nov. pro Pachystoma Guilding, 1828)
 Pachystoma Guilding, 1828: synonym of Pila Röding, 1798
 Pomus Gray, 1847: synonym of Pila Röding, 1798
 Tribe Sauleini Berthold, 1991: synonym of Ampullariidae Gray, 1824
 Turbinicola Annandale & Prashad, 1921: synonym of Pila Röding, 1798

Distribution 
The genera Asolene, Felipponea, Marisa, and Pomacea are New World genera that are native to South America, Central America, the West Indies and the Southern United States. The genera Afropomus, Lanistes, and Saulea are found in Africa. The genus Pila is native to both Africa and Asia.

Ecology 
Apple snails are exceptionally well adapted to tropical regions characterized by periods of drought alternating with periods of high rainfall. This adaptation is reflected in their life style; they are moderately amphibious. They have an operculum which enables the snail to seal the shell entrance to prevent drying out while they are buried in the mud during dry periods.

One of the more typical adaptations of apple snails is branchial respiration. The snail has a system comparable to the gills of a fish (at the right side of the snail body) to breathe under water as well as a lung (at the left side of the body) to respire air. This lung/gill combination expands the action radius of the snail in search for food. It is part of the snail's natural behaviour to leave the water when the food supply below the surface becomes inadequate.

Several apple snail genera (Pomacea, Pila and Asolene/Pomella) deposit eggs above the waterline in calcareous clutches and can be recognized by the light pink color they resemble. This remarkable strategy of aquatic snails protects the eggs against predation by fish and other aquatic inhabitants. Another anti-predator adaptation in the apple snail genera Pomacea and Pila, is the tubular siphon, used to breathe air while submerged, reducing vulnerability to attacking birds.
The apple snail's usual enemies are the birds limpkin and snail kite.

Apple snails inhabit various ecosystems: ponds, swamps and rivers. Although they occasionally leave the water, they spend most of their time under water. Unlike the pulmonate snail families, apple snails are not hermaphroditic, but gonochoristic; i.e. they have separate sexes.

Human use

As a common aquarium animal 

Apple snails are popular aquarium pets because of their attractive appearance and size. When properly cared for, some apple snail species can reach  diameter. Apple snails include species that are the biggest living freshwater snails on Earth.

The most common apple snail in aquarium shops are Pomacea bridgesii and Pomacea diffusa, (both called mystery snails or spike-topped apple snails, among other things). These species come in different colours from brown to albino or yellow and even blue, purple, pink, and jade, with or without banding. Another common apple snail is Pomacea canaliculata; this snail is bigger, rounder and is more likely to eat aquatic plants, which makes it less suitable for most aquaria. This species can also have different shell and body colours. The "giant ramshorn snail" (Marisa cornuarietis) although not always recognized as an apple snail due to its discoidal shape, is also a popular aquatic pet. Occasionally, the Florida apple snail (Pomacea paludosa) is found in the aquarium trade and these are often collected in the wild from ditches and ponds in Florida. The giant Pomacea maculata is rarely used as an aquarium species.

Apple snails are often sold under the name "golden (ivory, blue, black...) mystery snail" and they are given incorrect names like Ampullarius for the genus instead of Pomacea and wrong species names like gigas instead of maculata.

Temperature 
Apple snails are more active and lively in the higher part of this temperature range. In these higher temperatures, the snails tend to eat, crawl and grow faster. At the lower end of the temperature range, the snails may become inactive.

As a pest 
In the 1980s, Pomacea canaliculata was introduced in Taiwan to start an escargot industry. It was thought that such food culture could provide valuable proteins for farmers, who primarily live on a rice diet. However, the snails did not become a culinary success. Additionally the imported snails (like the native apple snail population, Pila) were able to transfer a parasite called Angiostrongylus cantonensis (rat lungworm). This parasite can infect humans if snails are eaten that have not been thoroughly cooked first.

Instead of becoming a valuable food source, the introduced snails escaped and became a serious threat to rice production and the native ecosystems. During the 1980s the introduced snails rapidly spread to Indonesia, Thailand, Cambodia, Hong Kong, southern China, Japan and the Philippines.

Hawaii experienced the same introduction of Pomacea for culinary purposes, and its taro industry is now suffering because of it.

Genera Marisa, Pila and Pomacea (except Pomacea diffusa and native Pomacea paludosa) are already established in the US, and are considered to represent a potentially serious threat as a pest which could negatively affect agriculture, human health or commerce. Therefore, it has been suggested that these genera be given top national quarantine significance in the US.

Nevertheless, apple snails are considered a delicacy in several regions of the world, and they are often sold in East and Pacific Asian markets for consumption.

As a bio-control agent 
Pomacea and Marisa species have been introduced to Africa and Asia in an attempt to control other medically problematic snails in the family Planorbidae: Bulinus species and Biomphalaria species, which serve as intermediate hosts for trematoda parasites. These parasites can cause swimmers itch and schistosomiasis, a disease that affects over 200 million people in tropical regions. One of the species introduced as bio-agent is Marisa cornuarietis; this snail competes with other snails and also directly preys on other species.

As food
In Veracruz, Mexico, there is a subspecies of apple snail known as Pomacea patula catemacensis Baker, 1922. This subspecies is endemic to Lake Catemaco. This large snail is locally known as "tegogolo" and is prized as a nutritious food item, with approximately 12 grams of protein per 100 grams of apple snail flesh according to the apple snail nutritional information. They are also low in fat and high in minerals. Only wild or specifically cultured apple snails are fit for human consumption; those found in domestic aquaria may be unsuitable.

References

Further reading

External links

 Applesnail website
 Apple Snail in Thailand 

 
Oxfordian first appearances
Extant Late Jurassic first appearances
Taxa named by John Edward Gray